Liam Mitchell may refer to:
 Liam Mitchell (footballer)
 Liam Mitchell (rugby union)